David M. Alexander, born in 1945 in upstate New York, is a writer of science fiction and mysteries who now lives in Palo Alto, California. Novels published under his own name are The Chocolate Spy, Fane, and My Real Name Is Lisa. Beginning in 2003, however, to avoid confusion with other writers with the same name, he began publishing under the pen name of David Grace: in that year Wildside Press published The Eyes Of The Blind under the David Grace name. All subsequent works, both novels and stories in magazines, have been published as by David Grace.  He has written ten stories for leading magazines: science-fiction for Analog both by himself and as a collaborator with Hayford Peirce, and mysteries for Alfred Hitchcock's Mystery Magazine. Alexander shared story credit with Dan Wright and Sam Egan for an Outer Limits TV series episode, "Joyride", starring Cliff Robertson that was broadcast during the 2000 season.

The film rights for My Real Name Is Lisa were optioned for a substantial amount of money for a two-hour television movie but because of casting issues the project was terminated. It has never subsequently been filmed.

Alexander graduated from Stanford University in 1967 with a major in history and a minor in economics, then received a Doctor of Laws degree from the. University of California, Berkeley Law School, in June 1970, graduating in the top ten percent of his class. He was licensed to practice law in California in January 1971 and in November 1977 was sworn in by Chief Justice Warren Burger and authorized to argue cases before the Supreme Court of the United States.

He is a member of the Science Fiction and Fantasy Writers of America. A longtime friend of noted science-fiction and fantasy writer Jack Vance, he has had a planet named after him in Vance's The Face and a famous law-giver named after him in Night Lamp.

Bibliography

Novels

As by David Alexander

The Chocolate Spy, Coward, McCann & Geoghegan, NYC, 1976, 
Fane, Pocket Books/Timescape Books, NYC, 1981, 
re-published as The Accidental Magician 
Smashwords.com, ebook, 2009. 
Wildside Press, Rockville, MD, trade paperback, 2010, 
My Real Name Is Lisa, Caroll & Graf, NYC, 1996, 
re-published as Stolen Angel 
Smashwords.com, ebook, 2009, 
Wildside Press, Rockville, MD, trade paperback, 2011,

As by David Grace 

The Eyes Of The Blind, Wildside Press, Rockville, MD, 2003, 
re-published as True Faith
Smashwords.com, ebook, 2009, 
Wildside Press, Rockville, MD, 2011, 
Etched In Bone, Smashwords.com, ebook, 2009, 
Wildside Press, Rockville, MD, trade paperback, 2011, 
Doll's Eyes, Smashwords.com, ebook, 2009, 
Wildside Press, Rockville, MD, trade paperback, 2011, 
The Forbidden List, Smashwords.com, ebook, 2009, 
Wildside Press, Rockville, MD, trade paperback, 2011, 
A Death In Beverly Hills, Smashwords.com, ebook, 2009, 
Wildside Press, Rockville, MD, trade paperback, 2010, 
Easy Target, Smashwords.com, ebook, 2009,  	
Wildside Press, Rockville, MD, trade paperback, 2011, 
Fever Dreams, Smashwords.com, ebook, 2009, 
Wildside Press, Rockville, MD, trade paperback, 2011, 
The Traitor's Mistress, Smashwords.com, ebook, 2009, 
Wildside Press, Rockville, MD, trade paperback, 2011, 
Daniel, Smashwords.com, ebook, 2011, 
Shooting Crows At Dawn, Smashwords.com, ebook, 2011,

Short fiction

As by David Alexander

"Best of Breed", novelette with Hayford Peirce, as by David Alexander and Hayford Peirce, Analog, December 1994 issue 
"Finder's Fee", novelette with Hayford Peirce  as by David Alexander and Hayford Peirce, Analog, cover story, April 1997 issue
"Felony Stupid", short story, Analog, summer 1997 issue  
"Tramp" (1998), novelette Analog, March 1998 issue
"Shrink Wrapped", short story, Analog, April 1998 issue 
"Elephants' Graveyard", with Hayford Peirce as by David Alexander and Hayford Peirce, Analog, March 1999 issue

As by David Grace

"The Human Dress", novelette, Analog, March 2003 issue
"Piece Work", short story, Alfred Hitchcock’s Mystery Magazine, November 2004 issue
"Willie Bats", short story, Alfred Hitchcock’s Mystery Magazine, March 2005 issue
"Forever Mommy", short story, Analog, September 2008 issue

References

External links

 David Grace's Website

1945 births
Living people
20th-century American novelists
20th-century American male writers
21st-century American novelists
American crime fiction writers
American male novelists
American science fiction writers
California lawyers
Novelists from New York (state)
UC Berkeley School of Law alumni
Stanford University School of Humanities and Sciences alumni
21st-century American male writers